Sheila Taylor (born May 29, 1969 in Calgary, Alberta) is a Canadian sprint canoer who competed in the late 1980s. At the 1988 Summer Olympics in Seoul, she finished eighth in the K-2 500 m event while being eliminated in the semifinals of the K-4 500 m event.

References
 Sports-reference.com profile

1959 births
Canadian female canoeists
Canoeists at the 1988 Summer Olympics
Living people
Olympic canoeists of Canada
Sportspeople from Calgary